Erik Arvid Teofron Dahlström (26 June 1894 – 30 October 1953) was a Swedish football player, who competed in the 1912 Summer Olympics. He was a member of the Swedish Olympic squad in 1912. He played as forward one match in the consolation tournament.

References

1894 births
1953 deaths
Swedish footballers
Sweden international footballers
Olympic footballers of Sweden
Footballers at the 1912 Summer Olympics
IFK Eskilstuna players
People from Eskilstuna
Association football forwards
Sportspeople from Södermanland County